Indus RPS Public School, Hisar is a non-profit day-boarding school in Sector 16–17, Civil Line Police Station Rd, Hisar, Haryana, India.

History
School was founded by Industrialist and Philanthropist (late) Chaudhary Sri. Mitter Sen Sindhu in 2002 
under Sindhu Education Foundation that runs several educational trusts and institutes under Indus Group of Institutions and Param Mitra Manav Nirman Sansthan.

Late Ch. Mitter Sen Sindhu founded The Indus Education and Research Centre (IERC), Jind during the year 2002. The IERC, a non – profit making trust mainly aims at imparting quality education through a nationwide network of public schools.

Description
The school is affiliated with Delhi Public School Society (one of the largest institutions providing education at school level in India) and  Central Board of Secondary Education, New Delhi (CBSE). The school has well-equipped laboratories, libraries, computer rooms, classrooms, sports facilities, music room, medical treatment room, and school transport.

See also
 Capt. Rudra Sen Sindhu - Chairman of Sindhu Education Foundation 
 Dr. Ekta Sindhu - chairman of Indus Group of Institutions
 Ms Priya Kaushik - Principal Indus RPS Public School, Hisar 
 Sindhu Education Foundation 
 Indus Group of Institutions - owned by the Sindhu Education Foundation  
 Param Mitra Manav Nirman Sansthan - owned by the Sindhu Education Foundation
 Education in India
 Literacy in India 
 List of universities and colleges in Hisar
 List of institutions of higher education in Haryana

References

External links
 Indus Public School, Hisar - Official Website
 Google Map

Boarding schools in Haryana
Schools in Hisar (city)